Asia Barak (also Romanized as Āsīā Barak and Āsīābarak) is a village in Khorgam Rural District, Khorgam District, Rudbar County, Gilan Province, Iran. At the 2006 census, its population was 12, in 4 families.

References 

Populated places in Rudbar County